Bjørn Brandenborg (born 10 December 1991 in Svendborg) is a Danish politician, who is a member of the Folketing for the Social Democrats political party. He was elected into the Folketing in the 2019 Danish general election.

Political career
Brandenborg first ran for parliament in the 2019 election, where he received 6,837 votes. This was enough for a seat in parliament. Brandenborg was re-elected in 2022 with 11,167 personal votes.

External links 
 Biography on the website of the Danish Parliament (Folketinget)

References 

Living people
1991 births
People from Svendborg
Social Democrats (Denmark) politicians
Members of the Folketing 2019–2022
Members of the Folketing 2022–2026